is a Latin phrase, directly translated as "by the fact itself", which means that a specific phenomenon is a direct consequence, a resultant effect, of the action in question, instead of being brought about by a previous action.  It is a term of art used in philosophy, law, and science. (Contrast this with the expressions "by itself" or "per se".)

Aside from its technical uses, it occurs frequently in literature, particularly in scholarly addenda:  e.g., "Faustus had signed his life away, and was, incapable of repentance" (from Christopher Marlowe, The Tragical History of Dr. Faustus) or "These prejudices are rooted in the idea that every tramp  is a blackguard" (from George Orwell, Down and Out in Paris and London). Its use is also found in rabbinic writings: "If a man sells a house, he  sells with it the door."

In Catholic canon law

 denotes the automatic character of the loss of membership in a religious body by someone guilty of a specified action. It indicates that the effect follows even if no verdict (in Latin) is pronounced by an ecclesiastical superior or tribunal.

See also
 List of Latin phrases
 
 Q.E.D.
 List of Latin phrases (E)#ergo

References

External links

Catholic Church legal terminology
Latin legal terminology
Latin philosophical phrases
Latin logical phrases
Latin words and phrases
Legal reasoning